Jung Jo-gook (born 23 April 1984) is a South Korean footballer who coaches for Jeju United FC.

Club career

FC Seoul
In 2003, after graduating Daesin High School and leaving its football team, Jung Jo-Gook joined FC Seoul (then known as Anyang LG Cheetahs) for his senior club, where he played as a striker in the team. He scored 12 goals in 32 appearances in his debut season and received K League Rookie of the Year in 2003. However, his good form did not last and he experienced a slump until 2007 because of continuous injury. In the second half of the 2008, he recovered his good performance and scored 8 goals in 14 appearances. In 2010 K League, he succeeded in scoring double-digit goals again in 7 years and led FC Seoul to champion of 2010 season.

AJ Auxerre
After spearheading FC Seoul‘s run to the K League title, Jung agreed terms with French Ligue 1 outfit AJ Auxerre.
By accepting Auxerre's contract offer, he became the third Korean at the time to ply his trade in Ligue 1. On 3 January 2010, Jung signed a two-and-a-half-year deal. He made his AJ Auxerre debut against ES Wasquehal on 8 January 2011, coming on as substitute for the 62nd minutes in the 1–2 away defeat in the French Cup. On 29 January 2011, Jung made his Ligue 1 debut for AJ Auxerre, coming on as a substitute in the 85th minute in the 2–0 defeat by SM Caen.

In the 2010–11 season, Jung made 15 appearances as a reserve player for Auxerre, scoring 2 goals. However, he lost his first team place and even as a substitute during the 2011–12 season, and subsequently signed for Ligue 1 rivals AS Nancy on 16 September 2011, on loan until the end of the season.

Returned to FC Seoul
On 6 July 2012, Jung Jo-gook returned to FC Seoul and played until 2015 season except Ansan Police FC for military service.

Gwangju FC
On 11 January 2016, Jung Jo-gook joined Gwangju FC. He performed well and had the best season of his career by scoring 20 goals in 31 league appearances. As a result, he was awarded the K League Top Scorer Award

International career
Jung Jo-Gook started his national team career from the Under-17 national team, participating in all of the age divisions (U-20s and U-23s) and is currently in the senior national team. This, according to some fans, is the 'elite course' in the South Korea national team. He has also participated in 2003 FIFA World Youth Championship during this time.

International goals
Scores and results list South Korea's goal tally first.

Club career statistics

Honours

Club
FC Seoul
K League Champions (2): 2010, 2012
K League Runner-up (1): 2008
FA Cup Winner (1): 2015
FA Cup Runner-up (1): 2014
League Cup Winner (2): 2006, 2010
League Cup Runner-up (1): 2007

Individual
K League Rookie of the Year: 2003
Korean FA Cup Top Scorer Award: 2004
K-League Top Scorer: 2016

References

External links

 Jung Jo-gook – National Team Stats at KFA 
 

1984 births
Living people
South Korean footballers
South Korean expatriate footballers
South Korea under-20 international footballers
South Korea under-23 international footballers
South Korea international footballers
Association football forwards
FC Seoul players
Ansan Mugunghwa FC players
Gwangju FC players
Gangwon FC players
AJ Auxerre players
AS Nancy Lorraine players
K League 1 players
K League 2 players
Ligue 1 players
South Korean expatriate sportspeople in France
Expatriate footballers in France
Footballers at the 2006 Asian Games
Asian Games competitors for South Korea
Sportspeople from North Jeolla Province